The National League South, formerly Conference South, is one of the second divisions of the National League in England, immediately below the top division National League. Along with National League North, it is in the second level of the National League System, and is the sixth tier overall of the English football league system.

The National League South was introduced in 2004 as part of a major restructuring of the National League System. Each year the champion of the league is automatically promoted to the National League.  A second promotion place goes to the winner of a play-off involving the teams finishing in second to seventh place (expanded from four to six teams in the 2017–18 season). The three bottom clubs were relegated to Step 3 leagues.

For sponsorship reasons, it has been known as Blue Square South (2007–2010), Blue Square Bet South (2010–2013), Skrill South (2013–2014),  the Vanarama Conference South (2014–2015), the Vanarama National League South (2015–2019) and the Motorama National League South following a three-year sponsorship deal announced in January 2019. Since the start of the 2015–16 season, the league is known as the National League South.

The National League South was reduced to 21 clubs for 2020–21 and was expected to expand to 24 teams in 2021–22. Due to the COVID-19 pandemic in England, the 2020–21 National League South season was curtailed and voided after written resolutions were put to a vote. No teams were relegated. Expansion would be implemented before the 2022–23 season, when the bottom club was relegated and four were promoted from Step 3. There will be four relegations from the South starting in 2023.

Current member clubs, 2022–23
The current member clubs for the 2022-23 season are as follows:

Current league stadia 2022–23

The stadiums of all teams in the league for the 2022–23 season are listed below in capacity order:

League winners

League records

See also
National League
National League North

References

External links
 The National League official site

2
6
2004 establishments in England
Sports leagues established in 2004
Eng